ZKS may refer to

Communist League of Slovakia
League of Communists of Slovenia
ZKS Granat Skarżysko
Zero Knowledge Systems, privacy technology company